The Dipodascaceae are a family of yeasts in the order Saccharomycetales. According to the 2007 Outline of Ascomycota, the family contains four genera; however, the placement of Sporopachydermia and Yarrowia is uncertain. 
GBIF accepted all the species and also added Magnusiomyces''' and Protendomycopsis'' to the family.
Species in the family have a widespread distribution, and are found in decaying plant tissue, or as spoilage organisms in the food industry.

References

Ascomycota genera
Saccharomycetes
Taxa named by Adolf Engler
Taxa described in 1924